Nilesh Dnyandev Lanke  is an Indian politician. He is a Member of the Nationalist Congress Party. In 2019, he was elected MLA of the Parner Assembly constituency in Maharashtra.

Early life 
His hometown is Hanga village located in Parner. He earned a BA in Political Science from Yashvantrao Chavan Open University Nashik in May 2016. He is also called Nete.

Positions held
 2019: Elected to Maharashtra Legislative Assembly.

Controversies 

On August 20, in a leaked audio it came forward that Nilesh Lanke harassed Jyoti Deware to such an extent that Jyoti Deware felt suicidal. Before that Nilesh Lanke came into news for hitting a health worker. Later the worker retracted his statement under pressure.

References

Living people
1980 births
Nationalist Congress Party politicians
Nationalist Congress Party politicians from Maharashtra